The T-23 was a prototype tankette developed by the Soviet Union during the interwar period. Only 5 Examples of the vehicle were produced.

Design history

The development of the T-23 began in 1929. The Red Army, now with experience from the earlier T-17 tankette, began development of the T-23. The design featured 2 crew members (placed on a row) with a single 7.62 mm DT machine gun as the primary armament. The armour was made of riveted iron and was up to 10 mm thick on the front and sides of the vehicle. It was equipped as well with a tail, similar to that of the T-18 tank.

Many of the original design features of the tank were changed during the development. Originally the T-23 was to contain the same 35 hp 4 cylinder engine as the T-18 light tank but this was eventually changed to a larger 60 hp version to enable it to reach speeds of up to 40 km/h. The length of the tank was also increased by almost 30 cm from original specifications.

Production
The T-23 never proceeded past the stage of a prototype stage. The design changes introduced to the tankette caused the price of production to rival that of the T-18 light tank itself, which had a much more powerful armament and a rotating turret. There were only 5 examples produced  before the project was scrapped in favour of licensing the Carden Loyd tankette from the United Kingdom in 1930. This design was subsequently modified into the T-27 tankette and began full production in 1931.

References

Tankettes
Tankettes of the interwar period
Armoured fighting vehicles of the Soviet Union
Military vehicles introduced in the 1930s